Matthias Sannemüller (born 2 September 1951) is a German violist.

Life 
Born in Leipzig, Sannemüller was born in 1951 as son of the concertmaster Horst Sannemüller and the opera singer Philine Fischer. In his youth he learned piano and violin from Klaus Hertel. From 1969 to 1974 he studied violin with Dieter Hasch at the Hochschule für Musik Franz Liszt, Weimar and viola with Dietmar Hallmann at the University of Music and Theatre Leipzig. Until 1975 he was aspirant at the University of Music and Theatre Leipzig. Besides his studies he attended music seminars in Pécs, Brünn and Weimar.

He received his first employment in 1976 with the Gewandhausorchester Leipzig. Since 1977 he has been solo violist at today MDR Leipzig Radio Symphony Orchestra. From 1978 to 1992 he was a member of the Gruppe Neue Musik Hanns Eisler. Concert tours took him to Asia, through Europe and the USA. Numerous premieres have been recorded on radio with the Leipziger Consort. He was appointed chamber musician in 1983 and chamber virtuoso in 1988. Four years later he founded the Ensemble Sortisatio, which is dedicated to Neue Musik.

Sannemüller is a connoisseur of Baroque music through his membership in various chamber orchestras, such as the Saxon Baroque Orchestra Leipzig and his playing on the baroque Scale length. The result is a CD recording of the Concerto for viola in G major by Georg Philipp Telemann, a reproduction of the Concerti with viola d'amore by Christoph Graupner, and the world's first recording of the reconstructed Viola Concerto in E flat major by Johann Sebastian Bach.

Prizes and awards 
As a member of the group "Neue Musik Hanns Eisler" Sannemmüller received the following awards:
 1980: Art Prize of the German Democratic Republic
 1986: Kunstpreis der Stadt Leipzig
 1989: Interpretation Prize of the MaerzMusik
 1991: Schneider-Schott Music Prize Mainz

Discography 
 1996: Neue Musik für Oboe (Edel Classics)
 1999: Thomas Buchholz: Eruption
 1999: Thomas Müller: Kraino – Ich verwirkliche
 2000: Viola da gamba concertata (Raumklang Records)
 2006: Johannes Brahms: Chorwerke (Edel Classics)
 2010: Norbert Burgmüller: Lieder und Kammermusik
 2010: Thomas Buchholz: UNDEUTschLICHt – zyklen für ensembles
The following recordings were made with the Ensemble Sortisatio:
 2003: Groupe Lacroix: 8 Pieces on Paul Klee (Creative Works Records)
 2004: Ensemble Sortisatio (Querstand)
 2009: Jean-Luc Darbellay: A Portrait (Claves Records)

Publications 
As an editor he published the following work:
 2008: Karl Ottomar Treibmann: Tonspiele für Viola (Friedrich Hofmeister Musikverlag)

Literature 
 Burkhard Glaetzner, Reiner Kontressowitz (ed.): Gruppe Neue Musik  "Hanns Eisler" 1970–1990. Spiel-Horizonte. Leipzig 1990, .
 Hans-Rainer Jung, Claudius Böhm: Das Gewandhaus-Orchester. Seine Mitglieder und seine Geschichte seit 1743.. Faber & Faber, Leipzig 2006, .
 Christoph Sramek (ed.): Die Töne haben mich geblendet. Festschrift zum 60. Geburtstag des Dresdner Komponisten Jörg Herchet. Klaus-Jürgen Kamprad publishing house. Altenburg 2003, .

References

External links 
 
 
 Biography of Matthias Sannemüller (PDF, 72 kB) at 

German classical violists
1951 births
Living people
Musicians from Leipzig